Bosnia and Herzegovina (BIH) competed at the 2005 Mediterranean Games in Almería, Spain with a total number of 49 participants (42 men and 7 women).

Medals

Results by event

Boxing

References
 Official Site

Nations at the 2005 Mediterranean Games
2005
Mediterranean Games